Akiodoris is a genus of sea slugs, dorid nudibranchs, shell-less marine gastropod mollusks in the family Akiodorididae.

Species 
 Akiodoris lutescens Bergh, 1879
 Akiodoris salacia Millen, in Millen & Martynov, 2005

References

Akiodorididae